The meridian 169° east of Greenwich is a line of longitude that extends from the North Pole across the Arctic Ocean, Asia, the Pacific Ocean, New Zealand, the Southern Ocean, and Antarctica to the South Pole.

The 169th meridian east forms a great circle with the 11th meridian west.

From Pole to Pole
Starting at the North Pole and heading south to the South Pole, the 169th meridian east passes through:

{| class="wikitable plainrowheaders"
! scope="col" width="130" | Co-ordinates
! scope="col" | Country, territory or sea
! scope="col" | Notes
|-
| style="background:#b0e0e6;" | 
! scope="row" style="background:#b0e0e6;" | Arctic Ocean
| style="background:#b0e0e6;" |
|-
| style="background:#b0e0e6;" | 
! scope="row" style="background:#b0e0e6;" | East Siberian Sea
| style="background:#b0e0e6;" |
|-
| 
! scope="row" | 
| Chukotka Autonomous Okrug — Ayon Island
|-
| style="background:#b0e0e6;" | 
! scope="row" style="background:#b0e0e6;" | East Siberian Sea
| style="background:#b0e0e6;" | Chaunskaya Bay
|-valign="top"
| 
! scope="row" | 
| Chukotka Autonomous Okrug Kamchatka Krai — from  Chukotka Autonomous Okrug — from  Kamchatka Krai — from 
|-
| style="background:#b0e0e6;" | 
! scope="row" style="background:#b0e0e6;" | Bering Sea
| style="background:#b0e0e6;" |
|-
| style="background:#b0e0e6;" | 
! scope="row" style="background:#b0e0e6;" | Pacific Ocean
| style="background:#b0e0e6;" |
|-
| 
! scope="row" | 
| Bokak Atoll
|-
| style="background:#b0e0e6;" | 
! scope="row" style="background:#b0e0e6;" | Pacific Ocean
| style="background:#b0e0e6;" |
|-
| 
! scope="row" | 
| Likiep Atoll
|-valign="top"
| style="background:#b0e0e6;" | 
! scope="row" style="background:#b0e0e6;" | Pacific Ocean
| style="background:#b0e0e6;" | Passing just east of Ailinglaplap Atoll,  (at ) Passing just west of Kili Island,  (at ) Passing just east of Ebon Atoll,  (at ) Passing just east of the island of Tikopia,  (at )
|-
| 
! scope="row" | 
| Island of Erromango
|-valign="top"
| style="background:#b0e0e6;" | 
! scope="row" style="background:#b0e0e6;" | Pacific Ocean
| style="background:#b0e0e6;" | Passing just west of the island of Tanna,  (at ) Passing just east of Walpole Island,  (at )
|-
| 
! scope="row" | 
| South Island — passing through the island's southernmost point, Slope Point
|-valign="top"
| style="background:#b0e0e6;" | 
! scope="row" style="background:#b0e0e6;" | Pacific Ocean
| style="background:#b0e0e6;" | Passing between the Hook Keys and Campbell Island,  (at )
|-
| style="background:#b0e0e6;" | 
! scope="row" style="background:#b0e0e6;" | Southern Ocean
| style="background:#b0e0e6;" |
|-
| 
! scope="row" | Antarctica
| Ross Dependency, claimed by 
|-
| style="background:#b0e0e6;" | 
! scope="row" style="background:#b0e0e6;" | Southern Ocean
| style="background:#b0e0e6;" | Ross Sea
|-
| 
! scope="row" | Antarctica
| Ross Dependency, claimed by 
|-
|}

See also
168th meridian east
170th meridian east

e169 meridian east